Rubens Raimundo da Silva (born 10 October 1989), commonly known as Esquerdinha, is a Brazilian footballer who play as an attacking midfielder for Gama.

Club career
Born in Recife, Pernambuco, Esquerdinha graduated with Santa Cruz's youth setup. He subsequently represented Icasa, Centro Limoeirense, Bragantino, Ituano, Caldense, Boa Esporte, Chapecoense, ABC and Red Bull Brasil before returning to Ituano in May 2013.

On 29 April 2014, after being crowned champions of the year's Campeonato Paulista, Esquerdinha signed a two-year deal with Goiás. He made his debut in the competition on 10 May, coming on as a second-half substitute in a 0–2 away loss against Palmeiras, and scored his first goal on 21 September, netting the second in a 6–0 home routing of the same opponent.

On 3 March 2019, Esquerdinha officially joined Indonesian club Bhayangkara. He played four games for the club in the Indonesia President's Cup, but on 13 April the club announced, that they had released the player in preparation for the 1st League of the 2019 season.

References

External links
Esquerdinha at playmakerstats.com (English version of ogol.com.br)

1989 births
Living people
Sportspeople from Recife
Brazilian footballers
Association football midfielders
Santa Cruz Futebol Clube players
Associação Desportiva Recreativa e Cultural Icasa players
Clube Atlético Bragantino players
Ituano FC players
Associação Atlética Caldense players
Boa Esporte Clube players
Associação Chapecoense de Futebol players
ABC Futebol Clube players
Red Bull Brasil players
Goiás Esporte Clube players
Coritiba Foot Ball Club players
Clube Náutico Capibaribe players
Fortaleza Esporte Clube players
Associação Atlética Anapolina players
Associação Atlética Aparecidense players
Cuiabá Esporte Clube players
Najran SC players
Bhayangkara F.C. players
Sociedade Esportiva do Gama players
Campeonato Brasileiro Série A players
Campeonato Brasileiro Série B players
Campeonato Brasileiro Série C players
Campeonato Brasileiro Série D players
Saudi First Division League players
Brazilian expatriate footballers
Brazilian expatriate sportspeople in Saudi Arabia
Brazilian expatriate sportspeople in Indonesia
Expatriate footballers in Saudi Arabia
Expatriate footballers in Indonesia